Susan Wood (born 1946, Commerce, Texas) is an American poet and the Gladys Louise Fox Professor of English at Rice University.

Life
Wood received her B.A. from East Texas State University and her M.A. from University of Texas at Arlington before continuing her graduate studies at Rice University.

She taught high school and worked as an editor and writer for The Washington Post and magazines.

Her poems have appeared in such journals as The Antioch Review, Callaloo, the Greensboro Review, Indiana Review, The Kenyon Review, The Missouri Review, the New England Review, The Paris Review, and Poetry.

Awards
 1991 Lamont Poetry Selection for Campo Santo
 Pushcart Prize for her poem "Diary,"
 1998 Guggenheim Fellowship for poetry

Works

Poetry books

References

Texas A&M University–Commerce alumni
University of Texas at Arlington alumni
Rice University alumni
Rice University faculty
1946 births
Living people
Poets from Texas
American women poets
People from Commerce, Texas
American women academics
20th-century American women writers
21st-century American women writers